Finnemore is a surname. Notable people with the surname include:

 Martha Finnemore (born 1959), American constructivist scholar of international relations
 John Finnemore (born 1977), British comedy writer and actor
 John Finnemore (born 1863) (1863–1915), British author
 Joseph Finnemore (1860–1939), British book and magazine illustrator